Ángel del Pozo (born 14 July 1934) is a Spanish actor. He appeared in more than seventy films since 1960.

He retired in 1980, and from 1990 to 2008 he worked as a executive producer and public relations on Gestevisión Group, from Mediaset España Comunicación.

In April 2020 he survived Covid-2019. On 11 October 2020 he received Tabernas de Cine Award on Almería Western Film Festival in Mini Hollywood and Fort Bravo.

Filmography

References

External links 

1934 births
Living people
Spanish male film actors
Male actors from Madrid